Ramon Gjamaci is a footballer for New Caledonia. He played in the 2008 OFC Nations Cup.

References

Living people
Year of birth missing (living people)
New Caledonian footballers
New Caledonia international footballers
2008 OFC Nations Cup players
Association footballers not categorized by position